When I Met U is a 2009 Filipino romantic comedy film directed by Joel Lamangan and starring Richard Gutierrez and KC Concepcion. The screenplay by Aloy Adlawan was written for Jose Javier Reyes to direct; Reyes later left, citing "creative difference". The title of the film is derived from an OPM song by Filipino musical group Apo Hiking Society called "When I Met You" which is also the film's official soundtrack. The movie was produced by GMA Pictures.

The film premiered in the Philippines on February 11, 2009.

Plot
Jenny (KC Concepcion) is an unpretentious mall promodizer searching for true love. A hopeless romantic, her quest leads her to Benjie (Richard Gutierrez), a cargo pilot who offers her the love she truly yearns. An unlikely romance begins when she hitches a ride with Benjie to attend a wedding in Palawan. On board, they openly show their dislike for each other but when the aircraft crashes in an unknown island, the two turn to each other for comfort and eventually absolve their differences.

Principal cast
 Richard Gutierrez as Benjie
 KC Concepcion as Jenny
 Alfred Vargas as Albert
 Iya Villania as Tracy
 Cherry Pie Picache as Conching
 Tirso Cruz III as Kardo
 Chanda Romero as Sylvia
 Tonton Gutierrez as Manny
 Bearwin Meily as Tato
 Chariz Solomon as Kim
 Perla Bautista as Eva / Albert's lola
 Bubbles Paraiso as Vernice
 Paolo Paraiso as Teddy
 Matty Lozano as Marcus
 Ynez Veneracion as Cynthia
 Raquel Villavicencio as Beverly/Tracy's mother

Critical reception
The film has received generally positive reviews from critics, obtaining a Grade B from the Cinema Evaluation Board, although to Bong De Leon of Journal Online, "KC Concepcion and Richard Gutierrez can now heave a sigh of relief after their second movie together, "When I Met U" made the grade. It deserves more than B." Mario E. Bautista of the People's Journal wrote, "it's way much better than their debut movie, 'For the First Time', thanks mainly to the well-written script of Aloy Adlawan". Bautista continues to rain praises acting, as well, "give winning performances". He concludes, claiming that "Richard has done many Valentine movies and this is certainly one of the best. It's as entertaining as his Valentine flick with Marian Rivera last year", which was My Bestfriend's Girlfriend.

Parodies in Bubble Gang
When I Hit U
When I Met Woo (sometimes Removes Jacky)
When I Met Argh

Box office
The film opened in SM City North EDSA, the country's biggest theater earning an estimated  on the mall's cinema, second biggest opening day income of all the Filipino movies shown at SM City North EDSA.

Box Office Mojo expressly stated at the bottom of the webpage that for the week of February 11–15, "The chart only includes information from Manila marketplace. Nationwide figures are not yet available."

The final gross of the movie is  according to Box Office Mojo in its five-week run.

Soundtrack

An 11-track official soundtrack for the film was released by Sony BMG. Here are the track-listing:
 "When I Met You" by APO Hiking Society
 "Gusto Ko La-mang Sa Buhay" by Itchyworms
 "BMD (Bring Me Down)"  by Cueshé
 "Gusto Na Kita" by 6 Cycle Mind
 "Ikaw Pa Rin" by KC Concepcion
 "Hintay" by Callalily
 "Di Nakikita" by Roots of Nature
 "Migraine" by Moonstar88
 "Letter Day Story" by KC Concepcion
 "Hanggang Dito Na Lang" by Jimmy Bondoc
 "When I Met You" by KC Concepcion and Richard Gutierrez

See also
 For the First Time (2008 film)

References

External links
 

2009 films
GMA Pictures films
Regal Entertainment films
2000s Tagalog-language films
2009 romantic comedy films
Philippine romantic comedy films
Films directed by Joel Lamangan
2000s English-language films